The round-eared tube-nosed bat (Murina cyclotis), is a species of bat in the family Vespertilionidae from Central and Southeast Asia.

References

Murininae
Mammals of Pakistan
Mammals of India
Mammals of Sri Lanka
Mammals described in 1872
Bats of Asia
Taxa named by George Edward Dobson